The Triangle of Fire (French: Le triangle de feu) is a 1932 French-German crime film directed by Edmond T. Gréville and Johannes Guter and starring Jean Angelo, André Roanne and Elisabeth Pinajeff.

Cast
 Jean Angelo as L'inspecteur Brémont  
 André Roanne as L'inspecteur Charlet  
 Elisabeth Pinajeff as Véra 
 Renée Héribel as Irène  
 Paul Ollivier as Maltère 
 Maurice Rémy 
 Marcel Merminod

References

Bibliography 
 Crisp, Colin. Genre, Myth and Convention in the French Cinema, 1929-1939. Indiana University Press, 2002.

External links 
 

1932 films
1932 crime drama films
French crime drama films
German crime drama films
1930s French-language films
Films directed by Johannes Guter
Films directed by Edmond T. Gréville
Films scored by Casimir Oberfeld
German black-and-white films
French black-and-white films
1930s French films
1930s German films